Hindelbank railway station is a railway station in the municipality of Hindelbank, in the Swiss canton of Bern. It is an intermediate stop on the standard gauge Olten–Bern line of Swiss Federal Railways.

Services 
The following services stop at Hindelbank:

References

External links 
 
 

Railway stations in the canton of Bern
Swiss Federal Railways stations